124th may refer to:

124th (Waterford) Regiment of Foot, an infantry regiment of the British Army, formed in 1794 and disbanded in 1795
124th Battalion (Governor General's Body Guard), CEF, a unit in the Canadian Expeditionary Force during the First World War
124th Delaware General Assembly, a meeting of the Delaware Senate and the Delaware House of Representatives
124th Division (People's Republic of China), a division deployed by the People's Republic of China. During the Korean War
124th Duchess of Connaught's Own Baluchistan Infantry, an infantry regiment of the British Indian Army
124th Fighter Squadron, unit of the Iowa Air National Guard that flies the F-16C/D Fighting Falcon
124th meridian east, a line of longitude 124° east of Greenwich
124th meridian west, a line of longitude 124° west of Greenwich
124th New York Volunteer Infantry Regiment, a volunteer regiment from Orange County, New York, during the American Civil War
124th Regiment of Foot (1762), an infantry regiment of the British Army, formed in 1762 and disbanded in 1763
124th Wing (124 WG), an Air National Guard composite unit located at Gowen Field Air National Guard Base, in Boise, Idaho
Ohio 124th General Assembly, the legislative body of the state of Ohio in 2001 and 2002

See also
124 (number)
AD 124, the year 124 (CXXIV) of the Julian calendar